The Pacific screech owl (Megascops cooperi) is a species of owl in the family Strigidae. It is found in Costa Rica, El Salvador, Guatemala, Honduras, Mexico, and Nicaragua.

Taxonomy and systematics

The Pacific screech owl has sometimes been treated as a race of western screech owl (Megascops kennicottii) or eastern screech owl (M. asio) but its vocalizations are distinct from theirs. Two subspecies are recognized, the nominate M. c. cooperi and M. c. lambi. The latter has also sometimes been treated as a separate species.

Description

The Pacific screech owl is a medium-sized member of Megascops and has prominent "ear" tufts and bright yellow eyes. Its facial disc is pale gray with a white and blackish border. Its crown and upperparts are a pale tawny gray with dusky and black vermiculation. Its closed wing shows two pale lines. It has paler off-white underparts with a darker herringbone pattern. It is colored like the nominate with the addition of dark bars and streaks on the crown.

Distribution and habitat

The more northern subspecies of Pacific screech owl, M. c. lambi, is found only on the Pacific slope of Oaxaca, Mexico. The nominate subspecies is found from eastern Oaxaca and Chiapas, Mexico, south along the Pacific slope through Guatemala, Honduras, El Salvador, and Nicaragua into northwestern Costa Rica. In the southern part of its range it can also be found on the upper Caribbean slope.

The Pacific screech owl inhabits a wide variety of vegetation communities. They include swamp forest and mangroves, arid and semi-arid woodland and scrub, open country with scattered trees and cacti, and secondary forest.

Behavior

Feeding

The Pacific screech owl is nocturnal and crepuscular. It hunts in clearings and the edges of woodland from a low perch and captures prey by pouncing or sallying. Its diet is mostly large insects but also includes other arthropods such as scorpions and small vertebrates like birds and flying squirrels.

Breeding

The Pacific screech owl's breeding phenology is not well known. It is thought to breed in the dry season. The clutch of three or four eggs is laid in a tree cavity, often an old woodpecker hole.

Vocalization

The primary songs of the two Pacific screech owl subspecies differ. That of the nominate has been described as "prrr pu-pu-PU-PU-PU-pu-pu" and that of M. c. lambi a "staccato croarrr-gogogogogogok". Both have secondary songs as well.

Status

The IUCN has assessed the Pacific screech owl as being of Least Concern. Its population is estimated to exceed 50,000 mature individuals but is believed to be decreasing.

References

External links
Pacific Screech-Owl in Nicaragua

Pacific screech owl
Birds of Mexico
Birds of Guatemala
Birds of El Salvador
Birds of Honduras
Birds of Nicaragua
Birds of Costa Rica
Pacific screech owl
Taxa named by Robert Ridgway
Taxonomy articles created by Polbot